Yomiuri may refer to:
 Yomiuri Giants, a professional baseball team based in Tokyo, Japan
 Yomiuri Nippon Symphony Orchestra, based in Tokyo, Japan
 Yomiuri Open, a golf tournament on the Japan Golf Tour until 2006
 Yomiuri International, a golf tournament on the Far East/Asian Circuit from 1962 to 1971
 Yomiuri Pro Championship, an invitational golf tournament held from 1952 to 1961
 Yomiuri Shimbun, a conservative Japanese newspaper
 Yomiuri Telecasting Corporation, a Japanese television network
 Yomiuri FC, one of the former names of Tokyo Verdy, a Japanese football club.